Mayetta may refer to:

Mayetta, Kansas
Mayetta, New Jersey